Dactyloscopus minutus, the tiny stargazer, is a species of sand stargazer native to the Pacific coast of Mexico where it can be found at depths of from .

References

minutus
Fish described in 1975
Taxa named by Charles Eric Dawson